Monidło is a wedding portrait based on a hand-coloured photograph of the bride and bridegroom.

External links 
 An example of a modern monidło
 A monidło featured in the 1970 film under the same title, based on a short story by Jan Himilsbach

Portrait art
Polish art